Alexander Bont is a fictional character appearing in American comic books published by Marvel Comics. The character was created by writer Brian Michael Bendis and artist Alex Maleev, first appearing in Daredevil vol. 2, #66 (Dec. 2004). He was retconned into being the Kingpin of Crime before Wilson Fisk. His story was told via flashbacks, which were drawn to resemble artwork from the Silver Age of comic books. The climax of Daredevil Vol. 2, #65 (Nov. 2004) alluded to Murdock having been Bont's attorney at one time. This plot thread was dropped however as it was revealed in later issues that Matt refused to be his lawyer.

A female version of Bont, primarily known as Alexandra, is portrayed by Sigourney Weaver in the 2017 miniseries The Defenders, a crossover between Marvel's Netflix series set in the Marvel Cinematic Universe (MCU), depicted as one of the five "fingers" of the Hand and its leader.

Fictional character biography

The First Kingpin
Alexander Bont first made a name for himself when he killed the hero known as the Defender. After that, he soon rose up the ranks and became the head of organized crime.

The Fixer, the man who ordered the hit on Jack Murdock, paid up to Bont. When Daredevil found this out, he confronted Bont and got him arrested. Bont got out on bail. He later asked Matt Murdock for legal help, but was refused.

When he got out, he paid a visit to the Gladiator who had worked for Bont in the past. He ordered Potter to kill Daredevil. "I made my rep on the blood of one masked mystery man...I'm not--I am not going to lose it over another one."

The Gladiator attacked Daredevil, but was defeated. Daredevil found out that Bont had hired him, and told Bont that he'd see him in jail for this.

Bont was found guilty and sent to prison. The last thing he saw before being loaded into the bus was Daredevil perched on top of a nearby building, smirking at him.

Bont's Revenge
When Bont was released from jail, he was now a bitter old man. He had found out that Daredevil was really Matt Murdock from The Globe and had acquired a possession of Mutant Growth Hormone.

The world had changed a lot in his absence. Places had changed and his beloved wife died while he was imprisoned. Furious, Bont set out to get revenge on Daredevil.

He met up with Melvin Potter again, who refused to work with him. Bont threatened him with the death of his daughter. "I've arranged for the murder of your four-year-old daughter. She's never met you, but she'll die because of you. You do what I say."

Potter kidnapped Matt Murdock, and was forced to beat him while Bont videotaped it. He then dragged Matt out (in his Daredevil costume) to show the public. When the new White Tiger arrived on the scene and defeated Melvin Potter, Bont took some MGH and threw Matt into a window, savagely beating him and telling him that this was where his father was killed.

However, the action, coupled with the overdose of MGH, proved to be too much for Bont. His heart exploded, killing him.

In other media
Sigourney Weaver portrays a female version of Bont, primarily known as Alexandra, in the Marvel Cinematic Universe (MCU) miniseries The Defenders (2017), a crossover between Marvel's Netflix television series. At New York Comic Con in October 2016, Weaver was announced to be playing the main antagonist of The Defenders, later revealed to be Alexandra. The producers had referred to the character as "a Sigourney Weaver type" for four months before Jeph Loeb contacted Weaver about the project. Described as one of the five "fingers" of the Hand and its leader, Weaver called the character "really smart", "very in charge", and more of an adversary than a villain. Showrunner Marco Ramirez described her as "a survivor" and "a very powerful force in New York City", adding, "She's everything Sigourney is: sophisticated, intellectual, dangerous"; the antagonist of the series had to be "something massive to pull these four [hero] characters from their individual worlds to work together". Alexandra is "charmed" by the four heroes teaming up against her, having "never met four people who are seemingly just interested in taking care of this one little part of New York ... they're unlike anybody she's ever faced off against before". Weaver worked with the writers to avoid a cliché portrayal, specifically "terms like 'ice queen' that are often thrown at women who aren't completely sympathetic". It was important to Ramirez and Weaver to introduce Alexandra sympathetically. The character is ultimately a supporting character in Elektra Natchios' overall story, with Ramirez saying that the writers were able to create a "really fun cool character" for Weaver to portray, but they did so in service of Natchios and the journey that she goes on.

Thousands of years before the events of the series, the elders of K'un-Lun came together to study the healing powers of qi. After five among their number to use this power to become immortal by sacrificing a dragon, they are cast out, becoming the five "fingers" of the secret organization the Hand, led by a woman known as Alexandra in modern times, alongside Madame Gao, Sowande, Murakami, and Bakuto. In the series, the Hand having defeated all that oppose them except for Stick (events depicted during the events of Daredevil) and the Immortal Iron Fist (events depicted during the events of Iron Fist). In modern times, with their immortality waning, Alexandra seeks to tunnel to dragon bones buried behind a mystical door beneath New York City to renew it, the process of which destroying will result in a series of earthquakes decimating the city, leading her to become opposed by the Defenders. Following the death of Elektra, Alexandra resurrects her body with the last of their resources to bring the ancient weapon known as Black Sky into existence, prophesied to destroy all enemies of the Hand, seeking to use her to steal the Iron Fist from Danny Rand. Criticized by the other "fingers" Under Alexandra's tutelage, Murakami questions Alexandra's reliance on the Black Sky suggests that they devise a new plan without Alexandra. After Sowande is killed by Stick, the other Hand leaders continue losing faith in Alexandra, as Elektra begins to regain memories of her previous life, before killing Stick on Alexandra's orders. As Alexandra gloats to the other leaders about this victory, she is killed herself by Elektra (after attempting to order Matt Murdock killed, whom Elektra had been romantically involved with in her original life), who claims leadership of the Hand.

References

External links
http://www.marvunapp.com/Appendix4/bontalexander.htm
http://www.imdb.com/title/tt1784594/

Characters created by Brian Michael Bendis
Characters created by Alex Maleev
Comics characters introduced in 2004
Fictional gangsters
Marvel Comics characters with superhuman strength
Marvel Comics supervillains